Eden Rugby Club (formally known as Eden Rugby Football Club) is a rugby union club based in Auckland, New Zealand. The club was established in 1922 and is affiliated with the Auckland Rugby Football Union.

History
Eden was formed in 1922, and in 1930 moved to Gribblehirst Park, where the club has been based since. Eden are the closest club in Auckland to Eden Park, with the club having attempted to build their clubrooms at the ground in the 1920s. Eden won the Gallaher Shield in 2021, beating Grammar TEC 19-10. Six All Blacks – Angus Ta'avao, Bruce McLeod, Frank McMullen, Ron Urlich, Ron Dobson and Hud Rickit – have played for the club, though not at the time of their international selection.

Current Status
Today, Eden fields a range of teams at senior and junior level, and also operate a Men's and Women's touch rugby competition during the summer months.

Internationally Capped Players

External links
Club website
Auckland RFU club profile

References
https://web.archive.org/web/20160304232829/http://www.edenrugby.co.nz/eden-rugby/history/

Sport in Auckland
New Zealand rugby union teams